Capital Safety is a manufacturer of fall protection, confined space, and rescue equipment for oil and gas, construction, utilities, wind energy, transportation, telecommunication, mining, and general industriesi. The company’s fall protection products are sold throughout the worldii. In addition to manufacturing, Capital Safety also provides in-house and on-site fall protection and rescue training servicesiii. It partners with insurance providers to hold 4-hour to 5-day safety training classesiv.

Capital Safety is based in Bloomington, Minnesotav. It has offices and facilities in China; Colombia, Brazil; Mexico; Dubai; Singapore; Australia/New Zealand; Canada; France; the United Kingdom and Slovakiavi.

History 

In 2006, Capital Safety acquired Unique Concepts Ltd., a confined space safety equipment brandviii.  In 2007, Arle Capital acquired Capital Safetyix. In 2010, Capital Safety acquired TAG Safety Ltd (UK) and the Technical Institute of Training in Height (ITFH) of Francex.  In January 2011, Capital Safety formed its Global Wind Energy team with wind-energy workers from the U.S., Canada, Europe, Asia and Australiaxi. In June 2011, Capital Safety opened a wind turbine training structurexii, located in Red Wing, Minnesota. Capital Safety also has a Wind Turbine training structure in Greenfield UK, near Manchester. In July 2011, Capital Safety acquired Latin America-based personal protection equipment company Arsegxiii. In March 2011, Capital Safety acquired Uniline Safety Systemsxiv. In January 2012, KKR & Co www.kkr.com. acquired Capital Safety for $1.1 billionxv. Stephen Oswald became Chief Executive Officer in March 2012xvi. On June 23, 2015, 3M www.3m.com announced a deal to acquire Capital Safety for $1.8 billion.

The Capital Safety brands—including DBI-SALA® and Protecta®—products, and people are now a part of 3M Fall Protection.

Locations 

Capital Safety is headquartered in suburban Minneapolis, Minnesota, with primary manufacturing and training facilities in Red Wing, Minnesota. It operates manufacturing, distribution and training facilities worldwidexvii. In the United States, distribution centers are located in Minnesota, southern California, Texas and Connecticutxviii. The wind turbine training structure is in Red Wing, MN and opened in June 2011xix. It also has a 7,000 square-foot training facility in Houston, Texas which includes competent person, authorized person, qualified person, program administrator, rescue, tower climber, and confined space coursesxx. Capital Safety has an international training center with telecommunications towers, masts and confined space rescue areas in Saddleworth, Manchesterxxi.

References 

“Company Overview of Capital Safety, Inc.” Bloomberg Businessweek. March 2012. http://investing.businessweek.com/research/stocks/private/snapshot.asp?privcapId=4370615
“Business News.” Industrial Hygiene News. March 2012, p. 19 https://web.archive.org/web/20160303232031/http://www.industrialhygienenews-digital.com/industrialhygienenews/20120304?pg=19 - pg19
“Red Wing, MN Leading Employers.” Red Wing Port Authority. n.d. https://web.archive.org/web/20120306030821/http://www.economicgateway.com/red-wing-port-authority/community-profile/?show=business_climate
"Capital Safety Announces Acquisition of Unique Concepts Ltd. of Winnipeg." Occupational Health and Safety Canada. N.p., 16 Jan. 2006. Web. 2 July 2012. http://www.ohscanada.com/pressroom/productdetail.aspx?id=3501
Banerjee, Devin. "KKR to Acquire Capital Safety From Arle Capital Partners for $1.1 Billion." Bloomberg. N.p., 28 Nov. 2011. Web. 2 July 2012. https://www.bloomberg.com/news/2011-11-28/kkr-agrees-to-acquire-capital-safety-from-arle-capital-for-1-12-billion.html
"Capital Safety Acquires Technical Institute of Training in Height." Contractor Supply Magazine. N.p., n.d. Web. 2 July 2012. http://www.contractorsupplymagazine.com/pages/News---20110113-Capital-Safety-Acquires-Technical-Institute-of-Training-in-Height.php
Dvorak, Paul. "Safety Team Ready to Harness Wind-turbine Issues." Windpower Engineering & Development. N.p., 20 Jan. 2011. Web. 2 July 2012. http://www.windpowerengineering.com/maintenance/safety/safety-team-ready-to-harness-wind-turbine-issues/ 
Pickerel, Kelly. "At the Top of Their Game." Wind Builder. N.p., 9 Jan. 2011. Web. 2 July 2012. 
"Capital Safety Acquires Shares in Arseg to Significantly Strengthen Its Latin American Business." Construction Distribution Magazine. N.p., n.d. Web. 2 July 2012. http://www.constructiondistribution.com/online/article.jsp?siteSection=2 
“Capital Safety Group acquires Uniline Safety Systems" Safety Access & Rescue. Web. 2 July 2012. 
Zuckerman, Gregory. "KKR to Acquire Capital Safety From Arle Capital Partners for $1.1 Billion." Wall Street Journal. N.p., 29 Nov. 2011. Web. 2 July 2012. https://www.wsj.com/articles/SB10001424052970204753404577066312140823368
"New CEO Joins Capital Safety." Occupational Health & Safety. N.p., 17 Mar. 2012. Web. 2 July 2012. http://ohsonline.com/articles/2012/03/17/new-ceo-joins-capital-safety.aspx
“Capital Safety Opens Distribution Center in Connecticut.” ISHN. March. 2011. http://www.ishn.com/articles/capital-safety-opens-distribution-center-in-connecticut
“Capital Safety Opens Training Structure.” Red Wing Republican Eagle. September 2011. 
“Capital Safety Opens Training Facility in Houston.” EC&M. Web. 6 May 2008. http://ecmweb.com/contractor/capital-safety-opens-training-facility-houston
“Company news.” A+A. Web. 2 July 2012. http://www.aplusa-online.com/cipp/md_aplusa/custom/pub/show,lang,2/oid,10506/exh_id,367/~/Web-NewsDatasheet/news_datasheet
Electra Largest Investments." Electra Investments. N.p., n.d. Web. 02 July 2012. http://www.electratrust.com/portfolio/top_invest_amtico.asp.
Anderson, Jake. “Capital Safety Equipment Co. to Move HQ to Twin Cities.” Twin Cities Business. N.p. 15 March 2012. Web. 12 Sept. 2012. http://tcbmag.com/News/Recent-News/2012/March/Global-Safety-Equipment-Co-to-Move-HQ-to-Twin-Citi 
“View or download the new Protecta fall protection catalog.” National Safety’s Weblog. April 2011. http://nationalsafety.wordpress.com/2011/04/08/view-or-download-the-new-protecta-fall-protection-catalog/
St. Anthony, Neal. “Safety equipment firm plans Twin Cities headquarters.” Star Tribune. March 2012. http://www.startribune.com/printarticle/?id=142512835

Companies established in 1998
Privately held companies based in Minnesota